Aleksandr Kravtsov (born March 18, 1974) is a retired male high jumper from Russia, best known for winning the gold medal in the men's high jump at the 2001 Summer Universiade. He set his personal best (2.31 metres) on 14 July 2001 at a meet in Tula.

Achievements

External links 

1974 births
Living people
Russian male high jumpers
Universiade medalists in athletics (track and field)
Universiade gold medalists for Russia
Medalists at the 2001 Summer Universiade